Thomas C. Harden (c.1856 – May 1925) was an American businessman and politician from New York.

Life
He owned with his brothers a trucking company in Brooklyn.

On December 21, 1909, Harden was elected to the New York State Senate to fill the vacancy caused by the death of Patrick H. McCarren, and was a member of the State Senate (7th D.) from 1910 to 1912, sitting in the 133rd, 134th and 135th New York State Legislatures.

Sources
 Official New York from Cleveland to Hughes by Charles Elliott Fitch (Hurd Publishing Co., New York and Buffalo, 1911, Vol. IV; pg. 367)
 MICHAEL GEORGE HARDEN... died (death notice of his brother), in NYT on April 10, 1917
 HARDEN IN McCARREN'S SEAT in NYT on December 22, 1909
 THOMAS C. HARDEN DEAD; Ex-State Senator Dies in His 70th Year in NYT on May 17, 1925 (subscription required)

1856 births
1925 deaths
Democratic Party New York (state) state senators